A brake is a metalworking machine that allows the bending of sheet metal. A cornice brake only allows for simple bends and creases, while a box-and-pan brake also allows one to form box and pan shapes. It is also known as a bending machine or bending brake or in Britain as a sheet metal folder or just a folder.

Description
The brake consists of a flat surface onto which the material is placed, and a clamping bar which will come down and hold the material firmly during the bend. This clamping action may be manual, automatic or operated using a foot pedal. The front, gate-like, plate of the machine is hinged and may be lifted, forcing the material extended over a straight edge to bend to follow the plate.

The bends can be to any angle up to a practical limit of about 120 degrees, somewhat more in the case of a bar folder. If the area to be bent is narrow enough, a sharper bend (e.g., for a hem) can be made by inserting the bend under the clamping bar and lowering it.

Box-and-pan brake
In a box-and-pan brake (also known as a finger brake), the clamping bar includes several removable blocks, which may be removed and rearranged to permit bending of restricted areas of a piece of sheet metal or of already partially formed pieces.

After bending, the box or pan form is then completed by screw, solder, weld, rivet, or other metal fixing process.

Bar folder
A bar folder is a simplified brake, usually much smaller than a cornice or box-and-pan brake. Typically, a single handle both clamps the workpiece and makes the bend, in a single motion. There is a gauge that can be set up to a depth up to one inch for consistent bends.

Examples of items a bar folder is used to fabricate would be end caps, "s" cleats, and drive cleats.

Press brake

This is a more complex tool that forms predetermined bends by clamping the workpiece between a matching punch and die.

Sizes
Brakes come in sizes suitable for light aluminum or brass for small boxes and operated by hand, up to industrial sized and counterweighted hand-operated or hydraulic machines suitable for large sheets of steel.

References

Metal forming
Fabrication (metal)
Metalworking tools
Plastics industry

de:Schwenkbiegen